Jean Bruchési, FRSC (9 April 1901 – 2 October 1979) was a Canadian writer, historian, public servant, and diplomat.  He was the president of the Royal Society of Canada for 1953–4.

He was the son of Charles Bruchési, KC and the nephew of Paul Bruchési, Archbishop of Montreal.

In 1937, he was appointed Under-Secretary of State of the Province of Quebec.

From 1959, Bruchési served as Canada's ambassador to Spain, Morocco and Argentina (with concurrent accreditation to Paraguay).

After his death in 1979, he was entombed at the Notre Dame des Neiges Cemetery in Montreal.

Distinctions and awards
 1949 - Léo-Pariseau Prize
 1949 - Ludger-Duvernay Prize
 1951 - J. B. Tyrrell Historical Medal
 1959 - Medal of the Académie des lettres du Québec

Personal life
He married Berthe Denis on 20 June 1930.

References

External links
 Fonds Jean Bruchési 
 Foreign Affairs and International Trade Canada Complete List of Posts 

1901 births
1979 deaths
Canadian political scientists
Fellows of the Royal Society of Canada
Academic staff of the Université de Montréal
20th-century Canadian writers
Journalists from Quebec
20th-century Canadian journalists
Canadian literary critics
20th-century Canadian historians
Burials at Notre Dame des Neiges Cemetery
Presidents of the Canadian Historical Association
Canadian civil servants
Ambassadors of Canada to Spain
Ambassadors of Canada to Morocco
Ambassadors of Canada to Argentina
Ambassadors of Canada to Paraguay
20th-century political scientists